Promoresia tardella is a species of beetle in the family Elmidae.

References

Further reading

 

Elmidae
Articles created by Qbugbot
Beetles described in 1925